John Duns FRSE (1820–1909) was Professor of Natural Science at New College, Edinburgh. He was a prolific author on both scientific and religious topics.

Life 
John Duns was born on 11 July 1820 in Duns, Berwickshire a descendant of John Duns. He was the son of William Duns and his wife Sarah Allen. He was educated in Duns then studied Medicine at Edinburgh University. He received the degree of Doctor of Divinity (DD).

At some point around 1840 he changed to study Divinity and in the Disruption of 1843 he sided strongly with the Free Church of Scotland, and was ordained by that body in 1844 to preach at Torphichen west of Edinburgh.

In 1859 he was elected a Fellow of the Royal Society of Edinburgh his proposer being James Young Simpson. He served as Vice president of the Society from 1899 to 1904.

From 1864 to 1903 he was Professor of Natural Science at the Free Church of Scotland's New College in central Edinburgh.

In 1875 he was elected a member of the Society of Antiquaries.  He was then living at 4 North Mansionhouse Road in the Grange district. By 1885 he had moved to 14 Greenhill Place in south-west Edinburgh and remained on this street moving to 5 Greenhill Place by 1905.

From its creation in 1891 he was Curator of the National Museum of Antiquities housed in the Scottish National Portrait Gallery on Queen Street.

In 1900 he was part of the Free Church of Scotland which became the United Free Church of Scotland.

He died on 1 February 1909 at Hilderley in North Berwick.

Family

In 1844 he married Margaret Monteith.

Selected publications
He was a strong anti-Darwinist in his writing:

Memoir of the Late Rev Samuel Martin of Bathgate (1854)
The Lithology of Edinburgh (1859)
Science and Christian Thought (1866)
Memoirs of Sir James Young Simpson (1873)
Fishes and Reptiles of Old Calabar (1875)
Creation According to the Book of Genesis (1877)
On the Tree Mallow (1877)
On an Undescribed Variety of Amethyst (1880)
Biblical Natural Science (dnk)

Artistic Recognition

His portrait by Hill & Adamson is held by the Scottish National Portrait Gallery. His portrait in stained glass by William Graham Boss forms one of the multiple portraits of committee members of the same gallery on the main stair.

References
 

1820 births
1909 deaths
People from Berwickshire
Alumni of the University of Edinburgh
Fellows of the Royal Society of Edinburgh
19th-century Ministers of the Free Church of Scotland
Ministers of the United Free Church of Scotland